Chowmahalla Palace or Chowmahallat is the palace of the Nizams of Hyderabad State located in Hyderabad, Telangana, India. It was the seat of power of the Asaf Jahi dynasty (1720-1948)  and was the official residence of the Nizams of Hyderabad during their reign. Presently the palace is converted into a museum but the ownership  still lies with the family.

The palaces is constructed at the location of an earlier existing palaces of the Qutb Shahi Dynasty and Asaf Jahi Dynasty close to the Charminar. Construction of the  palace as it stands today was started by Nizam Ali Khan Asaf Jah II  in 1769. He ordered to built four palace from which the nomenclature of Chau Mahalla was acquired.The word chār or chahār, and its variation chow, means "four" and the word mahal means "palace" in Urdu, Hindi and Persian.

History

While Salabat Jung initiated its construction in 1750, it was completed by the period of Afzal ad-Dawlah, Asaf Jah V between 1857 and 1869.

The palace is unique for its style and elegance. Construction of the palace began in the late 18th century and over the decades a synthesis of many architectural styles and influences emerged. The palace consists of two courtyards as well as the grand Khilwat (the Dharbar Hall), fountains and gardens. The palace originally covered , but only  remain today.

Southern Courtyard

This is the oldest part of the palace, and has four palaces Afzal Mahal, Mahtab Mahal, Tahniyat Mahal and Aftab Mahal. It was built in the neo-classical style.

Mehtab Mahal 
The Mehtab Mahal houses a library.

Northern courtyard
This part has Bara Imam, a long corridor of rooms on the east side facing the central fountain and pool that once housed the administrative wing and Shishe-Alat, meaning mirror image.

It has Mughal domes and arches and many Persian elements like the ornate stucco work that adorn the Khilwat Mubarak. These were characteristics of buildings built in Hyderabad at the time.

Opposite the Bara Imam is a building that is its shishe or mirror image. The rooms were once used as guest rooms for officials accompanying visiting dignitaries.

Khilwat Mubarak

This is heart of Chowmahalla Palace. It is held in high esteem by the people of Hyderabad, as it was the seat of the Asaf Jahi dynasty. The grand pillared Durbar Hall has a pure marble platform on which the Takht-e-Nishan or the royal seat was laid. Here the Nizams held their durbar and other religious and symbolic ceremonies. The 19 spectacular Chandeliers of Belgium crystal recently reinstalled to recreate the lost splendor of this regal hall.

Clock Tower
The clock above the main gate to Chowmahalla Palace is affectionately called Khilwat Clock. It has been ticking away since 251 years. An expert family of horologists winds the mechanical clock every week.

Council Hall
This building housed a rare collection of manuscripts and priceless books. The Nizam often met important officials and dignitaries here. Today it is a venue for temporary exhibitions from the treasures of the Chowmahalla Palace Collection of the bygone era.

Roshan Bangla

The Sixth Nizam, Mir Mahbub Ali Khan, is believed to have lived here and the building was named after his mother Roshan Begum.

The present Nizam (Barkat Ali Khan Mukarram Jah) and his family decided to restore the Chowmahalla Palace and open it to the public in January 2005. It took over 5 years to document and restore the palaces of the first courtyard to its former glory. The palace also has a collection of vintage cars, including the Rolls-Royce, which were used by the Nizam Kings.

Conservation 
Conservation works were initiated in Chowmahalla Palace from 2000, several conservation architects and experts were involved in more than a decade long journey. The initiative was undertaken by Princess Esra Birgen. Before commencement of the works, the place fell in disuse for a prolonged period and deteriorated over the time. Vision for the restoration project was to rescue the exemplary palatial complex and to establish a contemporary civic use as a museum showcasing the splendour and valour of Nizams.

The restoration process was divided into three stages, first stage involved thorough mapping, a fabric survey, and the development of conservation plans for the buildings' restoration as well as alternative re-use scenarios that might help assess the practicality of these historic buildings. In the second stage, structures that were in danger of collapsing had to be stabilised, and other urgent repairs like waterproofing and propping had to be made to prevent further damage. The complex's physical restoration as well as the addition of amenities to encourage the reuse of these structures were part of the final phase.

In order to preserve the integrity of these ancient structures, the conservation of these complex was executed by using traditional craftsmen and techniques, and several building components were saved. from demolition.  Many architectural features, including granite arches, elaborate lime plaster work, and terracotta balusters, were restored carefully in their original design in addition to structural repairs and stabilisation. Apart from bringing back the past glory of the palace complex and reviving traditional materials and craftsmanship,  the project also created a cultural oasis in the heart of the city.

The project was awarded with  UNESCO Asia Pacific Merit award for cultural heritage conservation on March 15 2010.UNESCO representative Takahiko Makino formally handed over the plaque and certificate to Princess Esra, former wife and GPA holder of Prince Mukarram Jah Bahadur.

Chowmahalla Museum 
The focus of the displays in the museum is to depict the origin and evolution of Hyderabad, achievements and valuable contribution of the Nizams towards the development of the state and social lifestyle of the royal family. 

The museum is distinctively divided into parts arranged around two quadrangle courtyard in North and South.

Northern Courtyard 
The entrance to the museum in through the Northern courtyard. Durbar Hall or Kilawat Mubarak is the most spectacular portion of the complex and its grandeur and intricately ornamented surfaces with magnificent chandelier makes it an object of exhibit in itself.

See also

 Nizam of Hyderabad
 Purani Haveli
 Falaknuma Palace
 King Kothi
 Chiran Palace
 Jewels of the Nizams
 Jacob Diamond
 Basheer Bagh Palace

References

External links

 The lost world: article by William Dalrymple about the last Nizam of Hyderabad and the restoration of Chowmahalla Palace
Travel guide issued by Authority: The Administrator, H.E.H The Nizam's Private Estate

Hyderabad State
Heritage structures in Hyderabad, India
Tourist attractions in Hyderabad, India
Royal residences in India
Palaces in Hyderabad, India
Palaces of Nizams of Hyderabad